Choiaella is an extinct genus of sea sponge ranging from the Chengjiang lagerstatten until the Lower Silurian.

It is closely related to the genera Choia and Allantospongia, which the Chengjiang fauna species C. radiata coexisted sympatrically with.

The species C. scotica is known from the Caradoc-aged fine sandstone of Wallace's Cast, Southern Uplands of Scotland.

The Silurian species has not been formally named.

References

Maotianshan shales fossils
Protomonaxonida
Silurian extinctions
Cambrian first appearances
Prehistoric sponge genera
Fossil taxa described in 1995